Presbyterian Church in New Scotland and the New Scotland Cemetery is a historic Presbyterian church and cemetery located at New Scotland in Albany County, New York.  The church was built in 1849 and extended in 1868.  It is a 2-story, three-bay-wide, rectangular frame structure with a -story front projecting vestibule / entrance block. It features a large, two-stage square central projecting tower.  The education wing was completed in 1957. The cemetery includes about 500 burials dating from the 18th to 20th century.  The congregation was founded in 1787 and the present structure is its second building.

It was listed on the National Register of Historic Places in 2010.

References

Churches on the National Register of Historic Places in New York (state)
Presbyterian churches in New York (state)
Protestant Reformed cemeteries
Churches completed in 1849
19th-century Presbyterian church buildings in the United States
Churches in Albany County, New York
1849 establishments in New York (state)
National Register of Historic Places in Albany County, New York